The Golden Eagle Award is an award given by the National Academy of Motion Pictures Arts and Sciences of Russia to recognize excellence of professionals in the film industry, directors, actors, and writers. Modelled after the American Golden Globe Awards, the formal ceremony at which the awards are presented is one of the most prominent award ceremonies in Russia, alongside the Nika Award.

The national Russian award is given out in 20 categories each January for motion pictures and TV series produced in Russia during the previous year. The awarding statuette is a silver eagle, originally made from copper with a jade pedestal, and was designed by sculptor Viktor Mitroshin. The design was later altered by the Spanish company Carrera y Carrera. The award was conceived by Nikita Mikhalkov as a counterweight to the Nika Award established in 1987 and run by the Russian Academy of Cinema Arts and Sciences in Moscow.

History

The Golden Eagle Award was founded on 4 March 2002 by the National Academy of Motion Picture Arts and Sciences of Russia. At the XXIV Moscow International Film Festival on 26 June 2002, the Golden Eagle was officially inaugurated by the National Academy of Cinematographic Sciences. Winners were Andrei Tarkovsky, George Zhzhyonov, Fyodor Khitruk, Tatiana Samoilova, Michel Legrand, and Bernardo Bertolucci. The Golden Eagle Award was modelled by film director Nikita Mihalkov after the Golden Globe Awards as a counterweight to the Nika Award, established in 1987 and run by the Russian Academy of Cinema Arts and Sciences in Moscow.

On 20 September 2002, the declaration of the first nominees took place in a press conference at the Union of Cinematographers. However, the ceremony of the cinema, scheduled for 27 September 2002, was transferred in connection with the death of Sergei Bodrov, Jr. and his crew, who died in the Karmadon Gorge. As a result, the first award ceremony was held on 25 January 2003.

Design

Originally, the "Golden Eagle" statue was made from copper with golden alloy around it and its pedestal from jade. It was created by sculptor Viktor Mitroshin, but later altered by the Spanish company Carrera y Carrera, which is based in Madrid. People of eight different professions, including the designer and polisher, manufacture each instance in about 55 hours.

Categories
The Golden Eagle Award consists of 20 merit awards for films from the previous year, as well as honorary awards for lifetime achievement.

Best Feature Film
Best TV Movie or Mini-Series
Best Television Series
Best Documentary
Best Animated Feature Film
Best Director
Best Screenplay
Best Actress in a Film
Best Actress on Television
Best Leading Actor

Best Actor on Television
Best Supporting Actress
Best Supporting Actor
 Best Cinematography
Best Art Direction
Best Costume Design
Best Music Score
Best Film Editing
Best Sound Engineer
Best Foreign Language Film

References

External links
 

Russian film awards
Russian television awards
Awards established in 2002
2002 establishments in Russia